Ampelocera hottlei is a species of neotropical trees in the Ulmaceae family.

Description

Trees 10–30 m tall; trunk 10–50 cm dbh, with narrow buttresses ca. 2 m tall; bark smooth, white to gray with dark lenticels. Branchlets light brown-gray, lenticellate; stipules ca. 4 mm long. Petioles 0.6-1.2 cm long; leaf blades, oblong to elliptic, 7–26 cm long, 2.6-10.5 cm wide, apex acuminate, base obliquely attenuate to rounded, margins entire, chartaceous to subcoriaceous when dry, dull dark green above, dull light green beneath, glabrous and smooth on both sides, lateral veins 3-5, palmately veined at the base of the leaf blade.

Inflorescences axillary compound dichasia, 1-2.5 cm long, with 8-17 flowers, the perfect flowers toward the apex and staminate flowers toward the base. Flowers purplish to yellowish green, puberulent bracteoles 1–2 mm long; calyx 1–2 mm long, with 5 lobes, externally puberulent; stamens ca. 16 in perfect flowers, ca. 8 in staminate flowers; stamens ca. 3 mm long; ovary puberulent, style branches ca. 4 mm long. Fruits yellow,  obovoid, 1.2-1.5 cm tall, 1-1.2 cm wide, velutinous, with persistent style.

Distribution and habitat
A. hottlei occurs from central Mexico to Nicaragua in primary rainforest or tropical wet forest.

Phenology
Flowering reported from February and fruiting from March to June.

Vernacular names
Mexico: coquito, cautivo, guaya, ojoche blanco, popo mojo. 
Belize: bullhoof, luin. 
Guatemala: luin, tison. 
El Salvador: tison. 
Nicaragua: cuscano, yayo.

Uses
Wood suitable for construction and making of railroad ties.

References

Further reading
 Pennington, T; Sarukhan, J; Arboles tropicales de Mexico, Universidad Nacional Autonoma de Mexico, Fondo de Cultura Economica, 2005, 

hottlei
Neotropical realm flora